The women's individual competition of the Biathlon World Championships 2011 was held on March 9, 2011 at 17:15 local time.

Results

References

Biathlon World Championships 2011
2011 in Russian women's sport